The 1940 Croydon North by-election was a parliamentary by-election held in the British House of Commons constituency of Croydon North on 19 June 1940.  The seat had become vacant when the Conservative Member of Parliament Glyn Mason had resigned. Mason had held the seat since the 1922 general election.

During World War II, the major parties had formed a Coalition Government and agreed an electoral pact, whereby they would not contest by-elections in seats held by the other parties in the government.  However, there was nothing to prevent other candidates from standing, and A. L. Lucas stood in Croydon North as an independent candidate.

Despite a very low turnout, the Conservative candidate Henry Willink held the seat for his party with a large majority. Lucas forfeited his deposit.

Election results

See also
Croydon North (UK Parliament constituency)
1948 Croydon North by-election
List of United Kingdom by-elections

References
Fred W. S. Craig. British Parliamentary Election Results 1918-1949. Political Reference Publications, 1969 

By-elections to the Parliament of the United Kingdom in London constituencies
1940 elections in the United Kingdom
1940 in England
20th century in Surrey
Elections in the London Borough of Croydon
By-elections to the Parliament of the United Kingdom in Surrey constituencies
June 1940 events